Andrew Coffey is an Irish sportsperson.  He plays hurling with his local club Nenagh Éire Óg and with the Tipperary senior inter-county team since 2016.

Career
Coffey was named in the Tipperary squad for the 2016 National Hurling League and made his league debut on 21 February against Kilkenny, when he came on as a late substitute.

References

External links
Tipperary GAA Player Profile

Tipperary inter-county hurlers
Nenagh Éire Óg hurlers
Living people
Place of birth missing (living people)
Year of birth missing (living people)